Porcellio longicornis is a species of woodlouse. This species was described by Johann Philip Emil Friedrich Stein in 1859. It is found in Bosnia and Herzegovina, Croatia, and Montenegro.

References 

Woodlice of Europe
Taxa named by Johann Philip Emil Friedrich Stein
Crustaceans described in 1859